Roche Percée  is a village in the Canadian province of Saskatchewan within the Rural Municipality of Coalfields No. 4 and Census Division No. 1. The village is situated near the Canada–United States border just off of Highway 39.

History 

In 1872 the Boundary Commission travelled through this area while surveying the border between Canada and the United States. 
During the 1874 March West trek of the North-West Mounted Police, the force established its first camp (called Short Creek Camp) at this location. The community began being served by the Soo Line in 1893, permitting the coal mines in the region to become operational. Roche Percée incorporated as a village on January 12, 1909.

In 2010, the provincial government signed an agreement with Southeast Tour & Trails Inc. to restore Roche Percée Park after being closed for over a decade.

In 2011, flooding on the Souris River inundated the village, forcing its residents to evacuate.  Of the 64 homes in Roche Percée, 28 were damaged beyond repair, and had to be demolished.

Historical properties
Roche Percée Provincial Historic Site is located nearby. Referred to by local residents as "the Rocks", it has large sandstone deposits in which some caves have formed. The name of the village comes from the Métis French name of the rock formations, which means "pierced rock" in French. Another similar formation Rocher Percé is located in Quebec.

Roche Percée Gallery

Demographics 

References

Villages in Saskatchewan
Coalfields No. 4, Saskatchewan
Division No. 1, Saskatchewan